Joseph Swagar Sherley (November 28, 1871 – February 13, 1941) was a U.S. Representative from Kentucky.

Biography
Born in Louisville, Kentucky, Sherley attended public schools, graduating from the Louisville High School in 1889 and from the law department of the University of Virginia at Charlottesville in 1891.
He was admitted to the bar the same year and commenced practice in Louisville, Kentucky.

Sherley was elected as a Democrat to the Fifty-eighth and to the seven succeeding Congresses (March 4, 1903 – March 3, 1919).
He served as chairman of the Committee on Appropriations during the Sixty-fifth Congress. He was an unsuccessful candidate for reelection in 1918 to the Sixty-sixth Congress. Following his defeat, he served as director of the division of finance of the United States Railroad Administration from April 1919 to September 1920, when he resigned and resumed the practice of law in Washington, D.C. In January 1933, he was offered the position of Director of the Bureau of the Budget by President-elect Franklin D. Roosevelt, but declined because of ill health. He died while on a visit in Louisville, Kentucky, February 13, 1941 and was interred in Cave Hill Cemetery.

References

Further reading

External links
 J. Swagar Sherley Papers, 1880-1969 at the University of Louisville Archives and Records Center

1871 births
1941 deaths
Burials at Cave Hill Cemetery
Politicians from Louisville, Kentucky
Democratic Party members of the United States House of Representatives from Kentucky